Liselotte Ebnet, also Ammann-Ebnet (11 February 1932 – 25 September 2009) was a German operetta soprano and mezzo soprano, as well as an actress and dubbing artist.

Ebnet was the third wife of the actor Lukas Ammann. The couple, who married in 1959, had a son who died at the age of six after a fall from a  balcony. She died in Munich at age 77.

Discography (partial) 
 Der König und ich, Label: Philips 1966
 Und der Himmel hängt voller Geigen, Label: Sonocord 1982 (2 LPs)
 Viktoria und ihr Husar/Blume von Hawai, Label: Eurodisc 1990
 Das Feuerwerk, Label: Hamburger Archiv für Gesangskuns

Literature 
 Staatstheater am Gärtnerplatz (publisher): Festschrift: 100 Jahre Staatstheater am Gärtnerplatz, Munich 1965

References

External links 
 
 

1932 births
2009 deaths
Place of birth missing
German sopranos
German film actresses
German stage actresses
German voice actresses
20th-century German women singers
20th-century German actresses